Gustav Malja (born 4 November 1995) is a Swedish racing driver.

Career

Karting
Born in Malmö, Sweden, Malja began his karting career in Formula Micro in 2006, winning the Gunnar Nilsson Memorial trophy the following year. By 2009 he had progressed up to the KF3 category, where he won the Swedish Championship and Gothenburg Grand Prix. In his final year of karting in 2010, Malja finished 22nd in the European KF3 Championship and fifth in the Junior Monaco Kart Cup.

ADAC Formel Masters
In 2011, Malja graduated to single-seaters, racing in the ADAC Formel Masters championship in Germany, despite being just 15 years of age. Driving for Neuhauser Racing, he took a single podium position at Assen to finish thirteenth in the standings. He continued with the team for a second season in 2012, taking three race wins and a further thirteen podium places to finish runner–up to champion Marvin Kirchhöfer.

Formula Renault 2.0
For 2013, Malja stepped up to Formula Renault, racing in the Eurocup Formula Renault 2.0 and Formula Renault 2.0 NEC championships with Josef Kaufmann Racing. In the NEC championship, he contested eight races, taking podium places at the Nürburgring and Most to finish fifteenth in the standings. In the Eurocup he finished twentieth in the championship, taking a single points–position at Paul Ricard.

Malja remained with Josef Kaufmann Racing in both championships for a second season in 2014. He finished fifth in the NEC championship, taking race victories at Hockenheim and the Nürburgring and two further podium positions. In the Eurocup, he scored points on eight occasions to finish twelfth in the championship.

Formula Renault 3.5 Series
Malja stepped up to the Formula Renault 3.5 Series in 2015 and raced for British team Strakka Racing.

Formula Three
In May 2015, Malja took part in the Pau round of the FIA European Formula 3 Championship, racing for EuroInternational in the car originally intended for Marvin Kirchhöfer before he left the team prior to the start of the season. He retired from the opening race of the event before finishing 25th in the remaining two races.

GP2/Formula 2
Malja contested in the Spa round of the 2015 season with Trident and the final two rounds with Rapax. In 2016, Malja joined the GP2 series campaign full-time for Rapax, finished on the podium twice and finished thirteenth overall.

For the 2017 F2 season, Malja switched to Racing Engineering. He finished third in the Monaco sprint race.

Formula 1
Malja participated in the second 2017 Formula 1 in-season test at the Hungaroring during 1–2 August, following the Hungarian GP weekend. Malja drove a Sauber C36-Ferrari for the Sauber F1 Team during the first test day. He completed 108 laps. His best lap was 1.21.503, set during aerodynamic and mechanical development runs.

Racing record

Career summary

Complete Formula Renault 3.5 Series results
(key) (Races in bold indicate pole position) (Races in italics indicate fastest lap)

Complete FIA Formula 3 European Championship results
(key) (Races in bold indicate pole position) (Races in italics indicate fastest lap)

Complete GP2 Series results
(key) (Races in bold indicate pole position) (Races in italics indicate fastest lap)

Complete FIA Formula 2 Championship results
(key) (Races in bold indicate pole position) (Races in italics indicate points for the fastest lap of top ten finishers)

Complete Porsche Supercup results
(key) (Races in bold indicate pole position) (Races in italics indicate fastest lap)

† Driver did not finish the race, but was classified as he completed over 90% of the race distance.

References

External links

 

1995 births
Living people
Sportspeople from Malmö
Swedish racing drivers
ADAC Formel Masters drivers
Formula Renault BARC drivers
Formula Renault 2.0 NEC drivers
Formula Renault Eurocup drivers
World Series Formula V8 3.5 drivers
FIA Formula 3 European Championship drivers
GP2 Series drivers
FIA Formula 2 Championship drivers
Porsche Supercup drivers
Neuhauser Racing drivers
Josef Kaufmann Racing drivers
Strakka Racing drivers
EuroInternational drivers
Trident Racing drivers
Rapax Team drivers
Racing Engineering drivers
Porsche Carrera Cup Germany drivers